Lovrenc Košir, also Laurenz Koschier (29 July 1804  – 7 August 1879) was a Slovenian civil servant who worked in Ljubljana. Besides Rowland Hill and James Chalmers, he is said to be the inventor of the postage stamp. He was born in Spodnja Luša, Carniola and baptized Laurentius Koschier. The Slovenized spelling of his name, Lovrenc Košir, appeared in print by 1937. He died in Vienna.

Idea of adhesive tax postmarks
In 1835, five years before the introduction of the worldwide first stamps in Great Britain, he suggested the introduction of adhesive tax postmarks (aufklebbare Brieftaxstempel) to the Department of Commerce in Vienna, which was responsible for the postal system. These postmarks were to be used for the pre-payment of postage. He called them gepresste Papieroblate (pressed paper wafers), which are known today as stamps. His suggestion was looked at in detail, but rejected for the time being.

Lovrenc Košir conceived that the stamps would be modelled on the official sealing stamps that were already used in Austria. However, because he had contact with England, it is presumed that he got the idea from James Chalmers, who had already made stamp designs one year earlier than Košir. However, Chalmers did not submit his designs until three years after Lovrenc Košir's suggestion.

Košir was immortalised on several commemorative stamps in Austria, Slovenia and Yugoslavia. Both Austria and Yugoslavia very much supported Lovrenc Košir being recognised as the one and only inventor of the postage stamp. On 21 August 1948, a commemorative stamp set was issued, which consisted of four stamps and showed his portrait. In the same year, the Yugoslav postal system issued an airmail stamp depicting Lovrenc Košir, his birth house in Spodnja Luša, and an aeroplane. What is special about these stamps is the allonge attached to each stamp. It has an inscription in Serbo-Croatian and in French giving information about Lovrenc Košir's contribution regarding the invention of stamps. On the centenary of his death 1979, Košir was depicted on an Austrian commemorative stamp (as Laurenz Koschier), with the inscription "pioneer of the postage stamp." In 2004, the Slovenian Post issued a commemorative stamp celebrating Košir's 200 years of birth.

References and sources

References

Sources
 Huber, K. (1979) Altösterreich-Lexikon - Vom Altbrief bis zur Briefmarke.
 Koczynsk, Stephan. (1924) Die Geschichte der Stempelmarken in Österreich. Pages 440–442.

External links
 

Austrian civil servants
1804 births
1879 deaths
Postal pioneers
People from the Municipality of Škofja Loka